Bonington's Hard Way in the central part of the south west face is considered to be one of the hardest Mt. Everest routes. First climbed in 1975 in expedition style and that time said by Chris Bonington to be impossible to be climbed in alpine style. 

Four Slovak climbers set off in a 1988 expedition to climb the Bonington route in alpine style, without supplementary oxygen and fixed ropes. After three of them reached the South Summit and one of them reached the Mt. Everest Main Summit they all disappeared in the descent. The route was never attempted to be climbed in alpine style again.

Events at the basecamp 
Four Slovak climbers and their doctor arrived at Everest Base camp at the beginning of September, 1988. At the base camp there were already US and French expeditions who fixed ropes through the Khumbu Icefall and demanded a 7000 dollars fee from other expeditions to use it. After several negotiations, French climbers allowed the  Czechoslovak – New Zealand expedition to use it. The Americans agreed after the promise of material compensations. The South Koreans agreement came after a promise of fixing ropes to the camp four to Lhotse as the Slovaks wanted to summit Lhotse as part of their acclimatisation

Acclimatization 
During the first week at the Everest Base Camp Dušan Becík, Jozef Just and Jaro Jaško established camp one, Dušan Becík and Jozef Just also camp two and camp three. Sherpas carried food and material to the camps. On 28 September Dušan Becík and Jozef Just summited Lhotse as part of the acclimatisation.  Peter Božík and Jaroslav Jaško later reached camp four where they spent one night and descended to lower camps.

The climb

12th of October 
Leaving base camp and reaching camp two (6400 m).

14th of October 
Leaving Camp two at 3 AM and starting alpine style climb of Bonington's Hardway. First radio call at 6 PM – climbers built bivouac at 8100 m under the most difficult part of the climb – stone wall of V – VI UIAA degree. They report the ascent to the bivouac was slowed down by the hard icy terrain.

15th of October 
Four climbers start climbing the stone wall at 8:30 and two hundred meters long climb takes the whole day and establishes a second bivouac at 8400 m. They report the climb to be more difficult than previously expected and don't report any health issues.

16th of October 
First radio call at 11 AM. The group is traversing the snow field to the south summit that can be visually confirmed from the camp two where the is the doctor of the expedition and climber Emil Hasík. Dušan Becík is slightly lagging behind the group and vomiting. The traverse is very slow and climbers are not reaching south summit and need to establish third bivouac at 8600 m in the evening. Climbers during radio call at 9.30 PM don't mention any health issues except exhaustion and Dušan's state is reported to be better.

17th of October 
9 AM radio call reports that climbers are leaving the bivouac and heading towards South summit (8760 m). They estimate to reach South Summit at 10 AM at 11 AM also reaching Mt. Everest main summit (8848 m).

1:40 PM radio call between Jozef Just and camp two where he reports reaching the main summit alone. He doesn't know about Peter and Jaro position, if they are descending or ascending, because they separated during the summit attempt. He also reports very strong wind. 

2:00 PM radio call between camp two and Jozef Just who is still on the summit of Mt. Everest. He is reporting that Dušan who decided not to attempt to reach the main summit waits for him at the South summit.

3:00 PM radio call from South Summit during which Jozef informs that Dušan is not waiting for him there. He suggests that Peter and Jaro turned around and are descending. His speech and articulation is showing utmost exhaustion. He is complaining about sight problems. 

4:00 PM radio call during which Jozef informs he is with Peter and Jaro, but they also have problems with sight and orientation. 

5:30 PM radio call. Jozef reports that they are approximately in the halfway from summit to the South Col. Dušan reconnected with their group and can see better than them. He reports Jaro to be lethargic and unwilling to continue. He reports they have good orientation in terrain and will make another radio call after reaching the South Col. Group of three American climbers and two sherpas are climbing to the South Col which they say should reach around 5 PM and visually locate the slovak group on the descend and be able to provide help. 

No further calls between camp two and four Slovak climbers is established. Jozef Just who was communicating through radio doesn't respond. Diana Dailey, Dave Hambly, Donald Goodman reach the South Col and in spite of strong wind the visibility is good. They cannot see anybody descending from the South Summit. They continue to visually monitor the terrain until the late night when strong wind changes into the 120 – 160 km/h hurricane.

18th of October 
10 AM radio call. American climbers report that nobody reached their camp at South Col and nobody can be seen on the descending way up to 8500 m. After check up of all remaining tents at South Col American climbers descend to camp three where they cannot find anyone neither. 

Ivan Fiala, leader of the expedition calls for forming of group of strongest sherpas who would reach the South Col and attempt to look for Slovak climbers. He offers 25th multiple of daily wage, but the storm considered to be too dangerous.

References 

Mount Everest expeditions